Largus may refer to:

 Scribonius Largus, Roman physician and writer
 Saint Largus, Christian martyr of the Roman era, associated with Cyriacus
 Largus (genus), a "true bug" genus
 Lada Largus, a rebadged Dacia Logan automobile